Scandalous is the fourth album by British soul/dance group Imagination, produced by Steve Jolley and Tony Swain and released in November 1983. In the US and Canada, the album was issued under title New Dimension in February 1984.

Scandalous failed to repeat the success of Imagination's previous albums, stalling at No. 25 in the United Kingdom and not producing a top 20 single.  It marked the start of a decline in the group's commercial fortunes; subsequent albums were even less successful.

Track listing

US and Canada release

Personnel 
Musicians
 Leee John – lead vocals, keyboards, percussion
Ashley Ingram – bass guitar, synthesiser, keyboards, vocals
Errol Kennedy – drums, percussion
Tony Swain – keyboards
Steve Jolley – percussion

Technical

 Tony Swain – producer, engineer, mixing
 Steve Jolley – producer, engineer, mixing
 Richard Lengyel – engineer, mixing
 Nigel Askew – photography
 Chess Creative Services – artwork
 Recorded and mixed at Red Bus Studios in Summer 1983
 On the US and Canada release, tracks 1 and 2 were remixed by Jonathan Fearing with engineer Carla Bandini at Sigma Sound Studios in 1984

Charts

References 

Imagination (band) albums
1983 albums
Albums produced by Jolley & Swain